The 2003 WGC-American Express Championship was a golf tournament that was contested from October 2–5, 2003 over the Capital City Club's Crabapple Course in Woodstock, Georgia. It was the fourth WGC-American Express Championship tournament and the third of four World Golf Championships events held in 2003.

World number 1 Tiger Woods won the tournament to capture his third WGC-American Express Championship and his seventh World Golf Championships title.

Round summaries

First round

Second round

Third round

Final leaderboard

External links
Full results

WGC Championship
Golf in Georgia (U.S. state)
WGC-American Express Championship
WGC-American Express Championship
WGC-American Express Championship
WGC-American Express Championship